The Col de Puymorens ("Puymorens Pass") is a mountain pass in the French Pyrenees, connecting Foix to Cerdagne. Its summit is 1,915m.

The pass historically crossed the border between France and Catalonia, until the Treaty of the Pyrenees in 1659 ceded the whole of this area to the former. It has been a well-travelled route since the 18th century and has featured several times in the Tour de France. In 1994, the pass was bypassed by a tunnel.

References

External links

 Col du Puymorens webcam

Mountain passes of the Pyrenees